Lycée français de Prague (LFP) is a French international school in Smíchov, District 5, Prague, Czech Republic. The school covers pre-maternelle (before preschool), until lycée (senior high school).

See also

 Czech Republic–France relations
 Embassy of France, Prague

References

External links

 Lycée Français de Prague
 Lycée Français de Prague 
 Lycée Français de Prague 

Schools in Prague
Prague
International schools in the Czech Republic
1999 establishments in the Czech Republic
Educational institutions established in 1999